Giddings–Lee County Airport  is in unincorporated Lee County, Texas, west of Giddings. It is owned by the City of Giddings and Lee County.

Facilities
In the year ending January 25, 2005 the airport had 4,500 general aviation aircraft operations, average 12 per day. 17 aircraft were then based at this airport:
82% single-engine, 6% multi-engine and 12% ultralight.

References

External links 
 

Airports in Texas
Transportation in Lee County, Texas
Buildings and structures in Lee County, Texas